Midway is an unincorporated community in Van Zandt County, Texas, United States. According to the Handbook of Texas, the community had a population of 31 in 2000. It is located within the Dallas/Fort Worth Metroplex.

History
A 1936 county highway map showed a church and several scattered houses in Midway. It had three businesses in 1987. Its population was recorded as 31 in 1990 and 2000.

Geography

Education
Today, Midway is served by the Canton Independent School District.

References

Unincorporated communities in Van Zandt County, Texas
Unincorporated communities in Texas